The Worcester and Birmingham Canal is a canal linking Birmingham and Worcester in England. It starts in Worcester, as an 'offshoot' of the River Severn (just after the river lock) and ends in Gas Street Basin in Birmingham.
There are 58 locks in total on the canal, including the 30 Tardebigge Locks, one of the longest lock flights in Europe. The canal climbs  from Worcester to Birmingham.

The canal also has connections with the Stratford-upon-Avon Canal, and the restored Droitwich Canal, it historically linked to the Dudley Canal Line No 2, until the route through the Lapal Tunnel was abandoned in 1917.

History

The parliamentary bill permitting its construction was passed in 1791 empowering the company to raise £180,000 (equivalent to £ in ), through 1,800 shares at a cost of £100 each. It also allowed them to raise a further £70,000, if needed, amongst themselves or by the mortgage of tolls and rates. The Act also permitted the company to allow landowners on the line to build wharfs and wharfhouse, and if they refuse to, the company are allowed to if needed. A further Act of Parliament authorised the raising of £149,929 amongst themselves or through the creation of new shares. However, the company were unable to raise the full amount of money authorised by the second Act, and so another was passed allowing them to raise £49,680. Another Act was passed to obtain more money in 1808. This Act empowered the company to raise £168,000 through the creation of 4,200 shares at £40 each. A final Act was passed in 1815 after the company had purchased land for reservoirs, which was not permitted in the previous Acts. The Act permitted the company to sell the land and to pay a debt of £29,096 (equivalent to £ in ), to the treasurers by 29 September 1815 as well, otherwise it would be taken out of the proceeds raised from selling the land.

The canal was surveyed by Josiah Clowes and John Snape. Its engineers changed often, and included Thomas Cartwright, John Woodhouse and William Crosley.

Construction of a double barge-width (14 ft) canal began in 1792 from the Birmingham end, but progressed slowly. Selly Oak was reached in October 1795 and Kings Norton Junction by May 1796, meeting the new Stratford-upon-Avon Canal which had by then reached Hockley Heath. By March 1797 the 2726 yard (2493 m) Wast Hills Tunnel was open and the canal was trading to Hopwood. In 1807 the canal reached Tardebigge without the use of locks. From Worcester Bar to Tardebigge top lock, the canal is at the 453 ft Birmingham Level. The cost of building  locks was too great so the 56 locks down to Worcester were built to the narrow  specification, with the final two locks connecting to the Severn in Worcester being  to allow river craft access to Diglis Basin.

The final 16 miles (26 km) was opened in December 1815. Plans to construct basins at Lowesmoor and Diglis were carried out eventually.

The Dudley Canal Line No 2 was built through the Lapal Tunnel to meet the canal at Selly Oak in 1798. After repeated collapses, the tunnel was finally abandoned in 1917 leaving a short stretch navigable between Selly Oak and a brick works at California until 1953, after which it was drained and filled in. A campaign group, The Lapal Canal Trust, is working to restore it, with a diversion around the tunnel.

A major user of the canal was the Cadbury chocolate factories at Bournville and Blackpole, Worcester.

Birmingham terminus
For twenty years direct connection to the Birmingham Canal Navigations (BCN) was prevented by the Worcester Bar, a physical barrier at Gas Street Basin, Birmingham designed so that the BCN would not lose water to the Worcester and Birmingham. Cargoes had to be laboriously manhandled between boats on either side. In 1815 an Act allowed the creation of a stop lock and the bar was breached. The Worcester and Birmingham raised their water level by six inches to minimise water loss and today the two pairs of lock gates have been removed. There were separate toll offices either side of the bar for the two canal companies. The bar still exists, with boats moored to both sides of it.

The commercial terminus in Birmingham was Worcester Wharf, a large complex extending from the bar along Bridge Street, Gas Street and Granville Street. Part of it now forms a water front to The Mailbox shopping and residential complex.

Birmingham West Suburban Railway

After the development of the new Birmingham New Street, a group of local business men noticed the resultant need for additional railway capacity south, through what were the under developed suburbs of south Birmingham and villages of northern Worcestershire. They therefore proposed development of a new branch railway, following the route of the Worcester and Birmingham Canal south to the Birmingham and Gloucester Railway to allow access to their new station at Kings Norton.

Needing finance for construction of the BWSR, the newly formed Midland Railway became involved in the deal. An eventual agreement was reached with the then loss making canal company, who would be paid a rent for the land, which later became a guarantee of a 1% share dividend. The payments to the canal company and development began in 1873, and the line was running by 1875. 
Originally the railway terminated at Granville Street station and later the Central Goods station and goods yard through a tunnel under the canal, both stations now demolished and built upon.

Today it forms a large part of the southern section of the Cross-City Line which runs in another tunnel under the canal adjacent to the Holliday Street Aqueduct.

Today

At Selly Oak, a new aqueduct, the Ariel Aqueduct (named after the former Ariel Motorcycles factory nearby), was constructed in 2011 to carry the canal over a new section of the A38.

The canal is popular for leisure and has narrowboat hire centres at Alvechurch, Worcester, Tardebigge, Dunhampstead and Stoke Prior.

The canal forms part of the Stourport Ring, a popular cruising circuit for holiday boating.

See also

Canals of Great Britain
History of the British canal system
Bittell Reservoirs
Tardebigge Engine House
Wychall Reservoir

References

Joseph Priestley (1831) Historical Account of the Navigable Rivers, Canals, and Railways, Throughout Great Britain, Longman, Rees, Orme, Brown and Green
Ordnance Survey First Edition map

External links
Worcester Birmingham & Droitwich Canals Society
map of milestones along the Worcester Birmingham Canal (click a pin &/or zoom out for all GB)

 
Canals linked to the River Severn
Transport in Birmingham, West Midlands
Transport in Worcestershire
Tourist attractions in Birmingham, West Midlands
Canals in Worcestershire
Canals opened in 1815